Iron Storm is a video game for the Sega Saturn. It was released in 1996 in North America. It is part of the Daisenryaku series which was developed by Systemsoft and published by Sega.

Story
Iron Storm is a strategy game that takes place within the context of World War II. The game's general premise is to allow players to pick a side (United States, Nazi Germany, or Imperial Japan) and then work their way across several battles within the war. The game takes place in both the Pacific Theatre and European Theatres. In addition, if a player wins certain battles then the path of the war changes. For example, Nazi Germany winning the Battle of Britain will allow for an eventual invasion of America, as will Japan defeating the United States at the Battle of Midway.

Gameplay
During battles in campaign mode, the player mobilizes a large variety of customizable units (tanks, aircraft, submarines, and warships) across a hexagon-shaped grid in order to defeat the opposing Allied or Axis forces controlled by the game's AI. In addition, as time progresses players can upgrade individual units either based on experience levels or as a blanket technology upgrade. Experimental weaponry is used in some later battles, including some German jet aircraft like the Messerschmitt Me 262. The map system itself is static, but real-time 3-D animations are used to recreate encounters between various types of units, an option that can also be toggled off.

Release
The game's North American publisher, Working Designs, donated 50 cents of every copy sold to the National Holocaust Museum in Washington, D.C.

Reception

Iron Storm was a minor hit in Japan.

The game was positively received by critics. Electronic Gaming Monthly gave the game an 8 out of 10, praising the ability to view the outcome of each battle in cinematic view and the use of experience points. A Next Generation critic found that the cinematic sequences at least initially dispel the perception of strategy games as "dry", and noted that they can be turned off once their novelty fades and they become simply a means of slowing down the gameplay. He was pleased that the gameplay is more straightforward and simple than other offerings in the genre such as P.T.O. II, and found the game overall "ranks with the best of its strategy companions". GamePros Scary Larry also found the game more accessible than other war simulators. He complimented the ability to name the commander for each country, the numerous unit types, the sounds, and the brutal depiction of warfare. He called the game "the best war sim to date ... and one of the most fun sims ever".

Electronic Gaming Monthly named Iron Storm a runner-up for Strategy Game of the Year (behind Dragon Force).

References

External links 

 Iron Storm in Sega Retro

1995 video games
Alternate history video games
Multiplayer and single-player video games
Sega games
Sega Saturn games
Sega Saturn-only games
SystemSoft Alpha games
Turn-based strategy video games
Video games developed in Japan
Working Designs